Viscount  was a Bakumatsu period Japanese samurai, and the 11th (and final) daimyō  of Nihonmatsu Domain in the Tōhoku region of Japan. He was the 12th hereditary chieftain of the Niwa clan. 

Nagahiro was the 9th son of Uesugi Narinori of Yonezawa Domain; his mother was a daughter of Matsudaira Yorihiro of Takamatsu Domain. He was married to the eldest daughter of Niwa Nagakuni. Following the defeat of Nihonmatsu Domain during the Boshin War in 1868, Nagakuni was placed under house arrest in Tokyo by the new Meiji government, which also ordered him to retire.  Nagakuni formally adopted his son-in-law, Nagahiro who then became daimyō, with Nihonmatsu reduced to 50,000 koku in its kokudaka (half of what it had previously held). When the post of daimyō was abolished, Nagahiro remained as Imperial governor of Nihonmatsu until the abolition of the han system.  

In 1884, with the creation of the kazoku peerage system, he received the peerage title of shishaku (viscount). He died in 1886 and his birth brother Nagayasu (Uesugi Narinori's 11th son) became the 13th chieftain of the Niwa clan.

References

Further reading
Nihonmatsu-han shi 二本松藩史. Tokyo: Nihonmatsu-hanshi kankōkai 二本松藩史刊行会, 1926 (republished by Rekishi Toshosha 歴史図書社, 1973)
Onodera Eikō 小野寺永幸. Boshin Nanboku Sensō to Tōhoku Seiken 戊辰南北戦争と東北政権. Sendai: Kita no Sha 北の杜, 2004.
Sugeno Shigeru 菅野与. Ōshū Nihonmatsu-han nenpyō 奥州二本松藩年表. Aizu-Wakamatsu shi 会津若松市: Rekishi Shunjūsha 歴史春秋社, 2004.

External links
Genealogical Information (in Japanese)
Concise Biography (in Japanese)

1859 births
1886 deaths
Kazoku
Meiji Restoration
Niwa clan
Fudai daimyo
Uesugi clan